Aleutian Islands earthquake may refer to:
 1906 Aleutian Islands earthquake
 1946 Aleutian Islands earthquake
 2014 Aleutian Islands earthquake